John Duncan FRSE LLD (1839-1899) was a Scottish surgeon who served as President of the Royal College of Surgeons of Edinburgh 1889 to 1891. On his father's death in 1866 he took over as  director of the major drug manufacturer Duncan Flockhart & Co.

Life

He was born on 18 August 1839 the son of Dr James Duncan then residing at 7 Dundas Street. He studied at the High School in Edinburgh then studied medicine at the University of Edinburgh. He graduated MA and received his MD in 1862. Part of his early training was under James Syme.

In 1866 he inherited his father's house at 12 Heriot Row. In 1870 he was elected a Fellow of the Royal Society of Edinburgh, his proposer being John Hutton Balfour. In 1870 he was also elected a member of the Aesculapian Club. From 1875 he was assistant surgeon at the Edinburgh Royal Infirmary being promoted to Senior Surgeon in 1887. He also served on the Board of Managers for the Infirmary. In 1890 Dr Henry Alexis Thomson worked with him as his assistant. He retired as a surgeon in 1895, that being the usual practice at the time.

His Edinburgh home was 8 Ainslie Place on the exclusive Moray Estate in western Edinburgh.

He died at Kinloch on the Isle of Skye on 24  August 1899, a few days after his 60th birthday. He is buried with his parents and wife on "Lord's Row" on the western wall of Dean Cemetery.

Family

His wife Jemima (1841-1885) died aged 44. His children were James Duncan (1867-1942), Eliza Alexandra Duncan (1868-1943), Margaret Duncan (1870-1941), Mary Elizabeth Morrison Duncan (1872-?), Ethel Graham Weir Duncan (1877-1947).

He was the uncle to William James Stuart (1874-1959).

Publications

Angioma and Other Papers

References

1839 births
1899 deaths
Medical doctors from Edinburgh
Alumni of the University of Edinburgh
Academics of the University of Edinburgh
Scottish surgeons
19th-century Scottish medical doctors
Presidents of the Royal College of Surgeons of Edinburgh
Fellows of the Royal Society of Edinburgh